Vice Admiral Sir Peter Egerton Capel Berger,  (11 February 1925 – 19 October 2003) was a Royal Navy officer who served as Flag Officer Plymouth from 1979 to 1981.

Naval career
Educated at Harrow School, Berger joined the Royal Navy in 1943 and served in the Second World War, taking part in the Normandy landings. He also took part in the Yangtse Incident aboard  in 1949 and was seriously wounded in the incident. After serving as Fleet Navigating Officer, Home Fleet and then Navigating Officer on the Royal yacht HMS Britannia, he was appointed Commanding Officer of the frigate  in 1962, Defence attaché at The Hague in 1964 and Commanding Officer of the frigate  in 1966. He went on to be Commodore on the River Clyde in 1971, Assistant Chief of the Naval Staff (Policy) in 1973 and Chief of Staff to the Commander-in-Chief Fleet in 1976. His last appointment was as Flag Officer Plymouth and Port Admiral, Devonport in 1979 before retiring in 1981.

In retirement Berger became bursar of Selwyn College, Cambridge.

Family
In 1956 Berger married June Kathleen Pigou; they had three daughters.

References

1925 births
2003 deaths
Royal Navy vice admirals
People educated at Harrow School
Knights Commander of the Order of the Bath
Lieutenants of the Royal Victorian Order
Recipients of the Distinguished Service Cross (United Kingdom)
Royal Navy officers of World War II
Fellows of Selwyn College, Cambridge